Simon Crosby is Co-founder and CTO of security software vendor Bromium Inc. and was a faculty member at the University of Cambridge, UK.

Career

Simon Crosby, Ph.D., is CTO at SWIM.AI, a continuous intelligence software vendor that focuses on edge-based learning for fast-data. He co-founded security vendor Bromium in 2010, later sold to HP Inc in 2019. He was the Chief Technology Officer of Data Center and Cloud Division at Citrix Systems from 2008-2011. Simon founded XenSource, Inc. in 2005 and held the position of Chief Technology Officer and Vice President of Strategy and Corporate Development. Prior to XenSource, he was a Principal Engineer at Intel.

Simon is an Equity Partner at DCVC, serves on the board of Cambridge in America, and an investor in and advisor to numerous startups.  He served as a Faculty Member at Cambridge University, UK, where he led the research on network performance and control and multimedia operating systems. Simon is the author of  35 research papers and patents on a number of data center and networking topics including security, network and server virtualization, and resource optimization and performance.

He holds a Ph.D. in computer science from the University of Cambridge, an MSc from the University of Stellenbosch, South Africa, and a BSc (Hons) degree in computer science and mathematics from the University of Cape Town, South Africa.

Education
Simon holds a PhD in Computer Science from the University of Cambridge, an MSc degree in Computer Science from the University of Stellenbosch, South Africa, and a BSc (Hons) degree in Computer Science and Mathematics from the University of Cape Town, South Africa.

References

1960 births
Living people
Intel people
University of Cape Town alumni
Alumni of the University of Cambridge
American company founders
Computer programmers
South African businesspeople
University of Natal alumni
20th-century American businesspeople